Cathy Hamblin (born January 6, 1953) is an American athlete. She competed in the women's pentathlon at the 1968 Summer Olympics.

References

1953 births
Living people
Athletes (track and field) at the 1968 Summer Olympics
American pentathletes
Olympic track and field athletes of the United States
Sportspeople from Pittsburgh